The American Elm cultivar Ulmus americana 'Star' was a selection made by the Plumfield Nursery, Fremont, Nebraska, c. 1945.

Description
'Star' was cloned by grafting cuttings from a local tree of compact growth with a much-branched, globose crown, very compact, but ultimately 'not as tall as others' (presumably other American elms).

Cultivation
'Star' was first marketed by the Plumfield Nursery (ceased trading c. 1980) in 1957; without any known resistance to Dutch elm disease, it is unlikely the tree remains in cultivation in North America or beyond.

References

American elm cultivar
Ulmus articles missing images
Ulmus